Events in the year 1946 in Spain.

Incumbents
Caudillo: Francisco Franco

Events 

 December 12: the United Nations General Assembly adopted Resolution 39 excluding the Spanish government from international organizations and conferences established by the United Nations due to the fascist nature of the Franco regime and involvement in the conspiracy that results in World War II. 
 December 13: the Franco government organized a large demonstration at the Plaza de Oriente in response to the resolution's adoption.

Births
June 13 - Gonzalo Aja.
July 29 – María Teresa Rejas, teacher and politician

Full date unknown
Ana M. Briongos (born 1946), writer

Deaths
June 16 - José María Miró. (b. 1872)

See also
List of Spanish films of the 1940s

References

 
Years of the 20th century in Spain
1940s in Spain
Spain
Spain